Antônio Carlos Santos de Freitas, known professionally as Carlinhos Brown (Brazilian Portuguese: /kaʁˈlĩɲus bɾaw̃, -iɲuʃ/, 23 November 1962), is a Brazilian singer, percussionist, and record producer from Salvador, Bahia. His musical style blends funk, latin music, R&B, soul music, reggae, and traditional Brazilian percussion.

Early life
He was born in Candeal Pequeno, a neighborhood in the Brotas area of Salvador de Bahia, Brazil, to Renato and Madalena. In 1967 he was still a child when Caetano Veloso and Gilberto Gil, two 25-year-old musicians from Bahia, started Tropicália, which would radically change Brazilian music.

Osvaldo Alves da Silva, his mentor, introduced him to Brazilian folklore.

Musical career

Early years
Brown learned to play various percussion instruments as he grew up and in the 1980s he began to collaborate with other artists. In 1984 he played with Luís Caldas's band Accordes Verdes, one of the originators of samba-reggae, and in 1985 he formed part of Caetano Veloso's band on the record Estrangeiro, penning a song, "Meia Lua Inteira", that was very successful in Brazil and outside the country. In 1985, Luís Caldas recorded "Visão de Cíclope", composed by Carlinhos Brown, and it became one of the hottest songs on Salvador's radio stations. Following this, he composed "Remexer", "O Côco" and "É Difícil" for other artists, earning him a Caymmi trophy, one of the most important music awards in Bahía, and led to his participation in world tours with João Gilberto, Djavan, and João Bosco.

Timbalada

In the late 1980s Brown started to form percussion ensembles to unite the people in his hometown. He simply gathered people in the streets and taught them basic percussion patterns. Candeal is a town whose residents share deep roots in Candomblé, a religion African slaves brought to Brazil. The customs and ceremonies shared in this religion brought a lot of drumming into the everyday lives of those living in Candeal. Carlinhos realized this enriched culture was an opportunity for growth. Eventually this gathering of peoples grew into a band called Timbalada which became so popular along with the other band he composed of Candeal residents – Vai Quem Vem (Who Comes, Goes)- that he had to build a concert stadium to hold all the people who came into town to watch them practice. Timbalada recorded eight albums and toured various countries around the world. Billboard magazine named their debut album the "best record produced in Latin America in 1993". Many of the proceeds went towards fixing up the streets of Candeal by repaving roads and renovating houses.

In 1992, Brown appeared on several songs on the album Ritual Beating System by the project Bahia Black. Organized by prolific producer Bill Laswell, Bahia Black brought together Brazilian musicians with American jazz players. Also in 1992, Brown composed and performed songs for Sergio Mendes's Brasileiro album, his songs for that album including "Fanfarra", "Magalenha" and "Indiado".

Solo career 

On the heels of Timbalada's success, in 1996 Brown launched a solo album called 『Alfagamabetizado』, on which he sang, composed, and played the instruments. That year also saw Brown appearing on the album Roots by the Brazilian metal band Sepultura.

In 1997, Brown made a cameo appearance performing the song "A Namorada" in the 1997 American film Speed 2: Cruise Control, and appeared on the film's soundtrack. He also appeared in a Brazilian movie, Navalha na Carne (Razor in the Flesh).

In 1998, he collaborated with Bonga and Marisa Monte on the track "Mulemba Xangola" for the AIDS benefit compilation album Onda Sonora: Red Hot + Lisbon produced by the Red Hot Organization.

Brown's second album, Omelete Man, was released in 1998, and was followed by a third album, Bahia do Mundo, Mito e Verdade, in 2001.

He released Carlinos Brown É Carlito Marrón in 2003 and collaborated with DJ Dero on the 2004 album Candyall Beat. The Carlito Marrón album achieved considerable success in Spain, where it was repackaged a year later with extra tracks, achieving a hit single "Maria Caipirinha" (with DJ Dero) on the Spanish charts in 2004. Carlinhos Brown remains active in the Salvador da Bahía community, founding the Pracatum Music School in the Candeal neighborhood in 1994 as a non-profit organization dedicated to education, cultural, and community development programs in the city, including a professional music school. In addition, he has his own recording label, Candyall Records. Brown has also begun painting, and his art works have been well received.

On 10 April 2007, Carlinhos' album A Gente Ainda Não Sonhou was released by SonyBMG. It was recorded in Salvador de Bahia between March 2005 and September 2006. Two songs were co-written with Marisa Monte and Arnaldo Antunes.

Carlinhos Brown is extensively featured in the 2004 documentary El Milagro de Candeal. The title is translated as "The Miracle of Candeal" and features the influence and transformation Brown has done for Candeal. What was once considered a dangerous shanty town is now seen as colorful music town.

In 2011, he collaborated with Los Van Van to record the track "Soy Loco Por Tí, América" for the Red Hot Organization's most recent charitable album Red Hot + Rio 2. The album is a follow-up to the 1996 Red Hot + Rio. Proceeds from the sales will be donated to raise awareness and money to fight AIDS/HIV and related health and social issues. More recently, he was featured in Shakira's song "LA LA LA" which was the kick off song for the 2014 World Cup in Rio.

In 2012, Carlinhos Brown was selected to be a judge in The Voice Brasil (Season 1), a reality talent show. His role as a judge continued consecutively for seven years. He has also been a judge on the spinoff show, The Voice Kids, throughout its five seasons.

Tribalistas

In 2002 he formed the group Tribalistas with Arnaldo Antunes and Marisa Monte, contributing vocals and drums to their self-titled album Os Tribalistas. Their single "Já Sei Namorar" became the number-one song on Brazilian radio stations, and their second single "Velha Infância" met with almost equal success. The album spawned two more hits in Brazil:, "Passe em Casa", co-written with Margareth Menezes, and "É Você". In 2003, Tribalistas won the Best Album, Best DVD, and Best Song (for "Já Sei Namorar") awards from the Multishow of Brazilian Music.

Social activism
Carlinhos established the Pracatum School or otherwise known as the Pracatum Project in 1994. Having established a name for himself, he wanted to do more than just write powerful lyrics, he wanted to help his hometown and the children, whom like him, had high hopes with such little resources. The proceeds of this school along with Timbalada went towards improving health reforms, urban development such as paving the streets that once had overflowing sewer water, and renovating unfinished housing projects.

Family
He and Raquel Machado (also Raquel Jacobs) have a daughter, Nina De Freitas (b. 1990). His current wife is Helena Buarque and they have four children together: Francisco (also known as Chico; b. 1996), Clara (b. 1998), Cecília (b. 2006) and Leila (b. 2009). He has a son named Miguel (b. 1997) from another relationship.

Discography
 1996 Alfagamabetizado (Blue Note)
 1998 Omelete Man (Blue Note)
 2001 Bahia do Mundo, Mito e Verdade (Blue Note)
 2003 Carlinhos Brown é Carlito Marrón (Blue Note)
 2004 Candyall Beat (Vale)
 2007 A Gente Ainda Não Sonhou (Sony BMG) 
 2010 Adobró (Sony BMG)
 2010 Diminuto (Sony BMG) 
 2012 Mixturada Brasileira
 2014 Marabó 
 2014 Vibraaasil 
 2015 Sarau du Brown

Awards and nominations

Carlinhos Brown was also honoured in 2003 with a Prince Claus Award, under that year's theme "The Survival and Innovation of Crafts".

References

External links

 – official site

Carlinhos Brown's release of Adobró and Diminuto albums (in Portuguese)

1962 births
Living people
Brazilian Candomblés
Brazilian percussionists
20th-century Brazilian male singers
20th-century Brazilian singers
Latin Grammy Award winners
People from Salvador, Bahia
Brazilian record producers
Latin music record producers
Latin music songwriters
21st-century Brazilian male singers
21st-century Brazilian singers